Neorgyia is a genus of moths in the subfamily Lymantriinae. 
The genus was erected by George Thomas Bethune-Baker in 1908.

Species
Neorgyia ochracea Bethune-Baker, 1908 New Guinea
Neorgyia javensis Collenette, 1949 western Java

References

Lymantriinae